Songea is the capital of Ruvuma Region in southwestern Tanzania. It is located along the A19 road.  The city has a population of approximately 203,309, and it is the seat of the Roman Catholic Archdiocese of Songea.  Between 1905 and 1907, the city was a centre of African resistance during the Maji Maji Rebellion in German East Africa.  The city is poised to experience significant economic growth in the near future as the Mtwara Corridor opens up in a few years. Projected to be the sixth fastest growing city on the African continent between 2020 and 2025, with a 5.74% growth.

History
Songea was a great Ngoni warrior, hanged in 1906 during the time of German repression of the Maji Maji rebellion. Songea had been spared the death sentence because he had surrendered. However he demanded to be hanged along with the other Ngoni leaders. The Germans complied.

After the Second World War, the area was marked for rapid agricultural development linked to the ultimately disastrous groundnut scheme. A railway had been planned from the coast to Songea and actually appeared in 1950s high school geography text books. During the liberation war with Mozambique the Songea area was a restricted zone and occasionally suffered aerial attacks by Portuguese forces. Its remoteness made it vulnerable to ivory poaching, and communications  remained unreliable until 1985 when a new British funded road was opened linking it northwards to the road and rail hub of Makambako.

Songea became a municipality in 2006.

Education
Songea is the home to many educational institutions including;

 Matogoro Teachers Colleges
 Peramiho School of Nursing
 Kigonsera High School
 Songea Boys Secondary School
 Songea Girls Secondary School
 Peramiho Girls School
 The St. Augustine University

Administration
Songea is coextensive with Songea Urban District and is divided into wards. It is managed by the Songea Municipal Council.

References

Populated places in Ruvuma Region
Regional capitals in Tanzania